Terpnomyia is a genus of picture-winged flies in the family Ulidiidae.

Species
 Terpnomyia angustifrons
 Terpnomyia bicolor
 Terpnomyia citrivitta
 Terpnomyia costalis
 Terpnomyia latifrons
 Terpnomyia nitens
 Terpnomyia subandina
 Terpnomyia tigrina

References

Ulidiidae
Muscomorpha genera